The Best of Bobby Vinton may refer to:

 The Best of Bobby Vinton (2004 album)
 The Best of Bobby Vinton (1985 album)